Mesila Doda (born February 6, 1971 in Kukës)  was one of the first members of the Democratic Party of Albania and a member of the Albanian parliament from 2001 until 2017.

She has studied economics at the University of Tirana and philosophy in Rome. Doda started her political career in 1991, during the student protests that caused the change of regime in Albania. She has held different political positions and has also worked as a journalist and tv presenter.
She joined the Democratic party in 1991, and left in 2016 through an open letter where she said that she regrets leaving the party, which she herself, together with other students and teachers created 25 years ago.

After leaving the Democratic Party of Albania she joined the Party for Justice, Integration and Unity, which is focused on advocating national issues like the Cham issue.

She is one of the most conservative MP's on the Parliament and has recently opposed legislation that grants same rights to LGBT people and legalization of marijuana and prostitution in Albania. She has also been accused of overt discrimination against the LGBT Community.

References

1971 births
Living people
Democratic Party of Albania politicians
Party for Justice, Integration and Unity politicians
21st-century Albanian politicians
21st-century Albanian women politicians
Members of the Parliament of Albania
Women members of the Parliament of Albania